Ammankovilpati is a village in Pochampalli taluk, Krishnagiri district, Tamil Nadu, India. It has more than 500 houses.

References 

Villages in Krishnagiri district